West of Pinto Basin is a 1940 American Western film directed by S. Roy Luby and written by Earle Snell. The film is the third in Monogram Pictures' "Range Busters" series, and it stars Ray "Crash" Corrigan as Crash, John "Dusty" King as Dusty and Max "Alibi" Terhune as Alibi, with Gwen Gaze, Tris Coffin and Dirk Thane. The film was released on November 25, 1940, by Monogram Pictures.

Plot

Cast
Ray "Crash" Corrigan as 'Crash' Corrigan 
John 'Dusty' King as 'Dusty' King
Max Terhune as Alibi 
Gwen Gaze as Joan Brown
Tris Coffin as Harvey
Dirk Thane as Hank Horton
George Chesebro as Lane
Carl Mathews as Joe 
Bud Osborne as Sheriff
Jack Perrin as Ware
Phil Dunham as Summers 
Budd Buster as Jeff 
Jerry Smith as Jerry Smith

See also
The Range Busters series:

 The Range Busters (1940)
 Trailing Double Trouble (1940)
 West of Pinto Basin (1940)
 Trail of the Silver Spurs (1941)
 The Kid's Last Ride (1941)
 Tumbledown Ranch in Arizona (1941)
 Wrangler's Roost (1941)
 Fugitive Valley (1941)
 Saddle Mountain Roundup (1941)
 Tonto Basin Outlaws (1941)
 Underground Rustlers (1941)
 Thunder River Feud (1942)
 Rock River Renegades (1942)
 Boot Hill Bandits (1942)
 Texas Trouble Shooters (1942)
 Arizona Stage Coach (1942)
 Texas to Bataan (1942)
 Trail Riders (1942)
 Two Fisted Justice (1943)
 Haunted Ranch (1943)
 Land of Hunted Men (1943)
 Cowboy Commandos (1943)
 Black Market Rustlers (1943)
 Bullets and Saddles (1943)

References

External links
 

1940 films
1940s English-language films
American Western (genre) films
1940 Western (genre) films
Monogram Pictures films
American black-and-white films
Films directed by S. Roy Luby
Range Busters
1940s American films